Jatun Punta (possibly from Quechua hatun (in Bolivia jatun) big, punta peak; ridge; first, before, in front of,) is a mountain in the Vilcanota mountain range in the Andes of Peru, about  high. It is situated in the Cusco Region, Quispicanchi Province, Ocongate District. Jatun Punta lies southwest of Callangate and west Puca Punta.

References

Mountains of Cusco Region
Mountains of Peru